Seldsienean (Old English for "seldom seen one") in an extinct genus of machimosaurid thalattosuchian from the Middle Jurassic of England and France. It is known from the Calcaire de Caen and the Cornbrash Formation.

Its type species, S. megistorhynchus, was originally described as a species of Steneosaurus in 1866, but was given its own genus in 2020.

References

Thalattosuchians
Fossil taxa described in 2020
Prehistoric pseudosuchian genera